Nine ships of the Royal Navy have been named HMS Brilliant.

  was a prize sloop taken in 1696 and sold in 1698.
  was a sloop in service in 1729.
  was a 36-gun fifth rate launched in 1757 and sold in 1776.
  was a 28-gun sixth rate launched in 1779 and broken up in 1811.
  was a 36-gun fifth rate launched in 1814, renamed Briton in 1889 and sold in 1908.
  was an  light cruiser launched in 1891 and sunk in 1918 as a blockship at Ostend.
  was a  launched in 1930. She served in World War II and was sold in 1947.
  was a Type 22 frigate launched in 1978. She took part in the Falklands War. She was sold to the Brazilian Navy in 1996 and renamed Dodsworth

Battle honours
Belgian Coast 1914
Zeebrugge 1918
English Channel 1940–43
Atlantic 1941–43
North Africa 1942–43
Falklands War 1982
Kuwait 1991

See also
 Brilliant (disambiguation)

References
 

Royal Navy ship names